Durham Cotton Mills Village Historic District are a set of historic mill village houses and national historic district located at Durham, Durham County, North Carolina. The district encompasses 15 contributing residential buildings built by the Durham Cotton Manufacturing Company.  They are -story, "story and a jump" gable end frame dwellings dated to the mid-1880s.  Twelve of the dwellings have rear one-story, gable-roofed ells.

It was listed on the National Register of Historic Places in 1985.

References

Houses on the National Register of Historic Places in North Carolina
Historic districts on the National Register of Historic Places in North Carolina
Historic districts in Durham, North Carolina
National Register of Historic Places in Durham County, North Carolina
Houses in Durham County, North Carolina
Neighborhoods in Durham, North Carolina